Pachypasoides is a monotypic moth genus in the family Lasiocampidae described by Shōnen Matsumura in 1927. Its single species, Pachypasoides albinotum, described by the same author in the same year, is found in Taiwan.

References

Lasiocampidae
Monotypic moth genera
Taxa named by Shōnen Matsumura